The Confederate Monument, also known as the "Comrades" Confederate Monument, is a Confederate memorial in Troy, Alabama, in the United States. The monument was installed in 1908 by the Pike Monumental Association, United Confederate Veterans, and the United Daughters of the Confederacy of Pike County, Alabama.

See also

 Confederate Monument (Camden, Alabama)
 Confederate Monument (Fort Payne, Alabama)
 Confederate Monument (Ozark, Alabama)
 List of Confederate monuments and memorials

References

1908 establishments in Alabama
Buildings and structures in Pike County, Alabama
Confederate States of America monuments and memorials in Alabama
Outdoor sculptures in Alabama